Fans Field may refer to two U.S. baseball parks.  Both are located in Illinois:
 Fans Field (Bloomington) 
 Fans Field (Decatur)